The 2008 season of Intercity Football League started from August 23, 2008. Taiwan Power Company F.C. won the league championship.

Qualifications
Taipei City (Tatung F.C.), Tainan County, Yilan County, and Taipei County qualified for being the top 4 places in the 2007 season. Taiwan Power Company F.C., Bros, Chia Cheng Hsin, and Hualien County qualified through the qualification tournament held between July 19 and August 2.

First stage

Results

Second stage

Results

Home grounds

Awards
 Golden Boot  Chen Po-liang (Chia Cheng Hsin) - 12 goals
 Golden Ball  Chen Po-liang (Chia Cheng Hsin)
 Best Manager  Chen Kuei-jen (Taipower)
 Best XI
 Goalkeeper:  Pan Wei-chih (Taipower)
 Defenders:  Chen Yi-wei (Chia Cheng Hsin),  Tsai Hsien-tang (Tatung),  Lee Meng-chian (Taipower),  Hsieh Meng-hsuan (Hun Sing)
 Midfielders:  Huang Cheng-tsung (Hun Sing),  Lin Kuei-pin (Tatung),  Pan Kuao-kai (Taipower),  Huang Kai-chun (Chia Cheng Hsin)
 Forwards:  Kuo Yin-hung (Taipower),  Chang Han (Hualien County)

Source: Chinese Taipei Football Association

References

Top level Taiwanese football league seasons
Intercity Football League seasons
Taipei
1